In Ukraine, a 2007 law requires open access publishing of research created through public funding. In January 2008, Ukrainian, Belarusian, and Russian academics issued the "Belgorod Declaration on open access to scientific knowledge and cultural heritage." Ukrainian academics issued another statement in June 2009 in support of open access.

Repositories 
There are a number of collections of scholarship in Ukraine housed in digital open access repositories. They contain journal articles, book chapters, data, and other research outputs that are free to read.

See also
 Internet in Ukraine
 Education in Ukraine
 List of universities in Ukraine
 Media of Ukraine
 Science and technology in Ukraine
 Access to public information in Ukraine
 Open access in other countries

References

Further reading

External links
 
 
 
 
 

Academia in Ukraine
Communications in Ukraine
Ukraine
Science and technology in Ukraine